Oya River ( or ) is a river in Sarawak, Malaysia. The river mouth is located in Kuala Oya, Oya in Mukah Division. The river flows approximately 31 km and has a basin area of 2143.92 km2.

The river is the longest river in Mukah Division.

History 
The river was once under the control of the Bruneian Empire until it was ceded to James Brooke in 1861 and became part of the Raj of Sarawak.

Settlements

The river flows through small towns of Stapang, Dalat, and Oya.

Issues

Water hyacinth overgrowth
The uncontrolled growth of water hyacinth posed a number of problems such as restricting the river flow and causing the water to become stagnant; making it difficult for fishermen and boatmen to maneuver their boats, especially the ones with motor engines, due to entanglement; clogging the drains and other waterways which, in turn, could cause floods; and turning the Oya River into a hideout for crocodiles. The Ministry of Transport (MoT) Sarawak will cooperate with the Department of Irrigation and Drainage (DID) and Universiti Malaysia Sarawak (Unimas) in conducting a comprehensive study with regards to the problem.

Crocodile attacks
Reports of saltwater crocodile attacks are pretty common especially at the downstream part of the river. The victims of these attacks are mostly fishermen who depend on the river for their livelihoods. A joint operation by Sarawak Forestry Corporation (SFC) and Royal Malaysia Police in March 2021 recorded 22 sightings of the reptiles. A 4.5-meter crocodile was caught during the operation.

References

Rivers of Sarawak
Rivers of Malaysia